Maritime is an album by Minotaur Shock, released in 2005 via 4AD. At Metacritic, which assigns a normalised rating out of 100 to reviews from mainstream critics, Maritime received an average score of 76, based on 15 reviews, indicating "generally favorable reviews".

Track listing
"Muesli" – 3:06
"(She's In) Dry Dock Now" – 3:56
"Vigo Bay" – 4:22
"Six Foolish Fishermen" – 3:54
"Hilly" – 6:33
"Twosley" – 4:05
"Somebody Once Told Me It Existed But They Never Found It" – 6:00
"Luck Shield" – 5:42
"Mistaken Tourist" – 5:17
"The Broads" – 4:07
"Four Magpies" – 5:37

References

External links

Minotaur Shock albums
2005 albums
4AD albums